Telostylinus is a genus of flies in the family Neriidae.

Species
Telostylinus bilineatus (Meijere, 1911)
Telostylinus dahli Enderlein, 1922
Telostylinus duplicatus (Wiedemann, 1830)
Telostylinus gressitti Aczél, 1959
Telostylinus humeralis Meijere, 1924
Telostylinus lineolatus (Wiedemann, 1830)
Telostylinus longicoxa (Thomson, 1869)
Telostylinus longipennis Aczél, 1954
Telostylinus luridus Enderlein, 1922
Telostylinus mocsaryi (Kertész, 1899)
Telostylinus montanus (Meijere, 1911)
Telostylinus papuanus (Meijere, 1915)
Telostylinus ponapensis Aczél, 1959
Telostylinus praeses Hennig, 1937
Telostylinus speculator Hennig, 1937
Telostylinus spinicoxa Aczél, 1954
Telostylinus sumatrensis (Meijere, 1919)
Telostylinus tinctipennis (Meijere, 1919)
Telostylinus yapensis Aczél, 1959
Telostylinus zonalis Aczél, 1954

References

Nerioidea genera
Taxa named by Günther Enderlein
Neriidae
Diptera of Australasia
Diptera of Asia